Christian Høgni Jacobsen (born 12 May 1980) is a Faroese football striker, who lastly played for NSÍ. Jacobsen has also played for HB, and B68. He has been the topscorer of the Faroe Islands Premier League 3 times. Jacobsen had spells in Denmark with Esbjerg, Vejle, AB, and ÍF Føroyar. He has gained caps with Faroe Islands at senior level.

Club career
He made his debut in Faroese football with NSÍ Runavík in the 1997 season and later moved abroad to play for Danish sides Esbjerg fB and Vejle BK before returning to the Faroe Islands in 2004. He played for NSÍ in 2005 and 2006, in 2007 he played for HB Tórshavn the first half and for NSÍ Runavík in the second half of the season. In 2008, he played for HB Tórshavn and in 2009 to 2011 he played for NSÍ Runavík. In 2012, he plays for B68 Toftir. In December 2012 he signed for Danish club ÍF Føroyar.

Winner of the Golden Boot 2010, 2006 and 2005
Christian Høgni Jacobsen scored 22 goals in Vodafonedeildin in 2010 and won the golden boot for being the top scorer that year together with Arnbjørn Hansen from EB/Streymur. Jacobsen won the golden boot in 2005 and 2006. Both years he scored 18 goals for NSÍ.

International career
Høgni Jacobsen made his debut for the Faroe Islands in a January 2001 friendly match against Sweden, coming on as a substitute for Todi Jónsson. He has collected 50 caps since, scoring 2 goals.

International goals
Scores and results list Faroe Islands' goal tally first.

References

External links
 
 Profile at faroesoccer.com 
The full list of Faroe Islands national men's team from the Faroe Islands Football Association

1980 births
Living people
People from Runavík
Faroese footballers
Faroe Islands international footballers
Danish Superliga players
Danish 1st Division players
Esbjerg fB players
Vejle Boldklub players
Akademisk Boldklub players
NSÍ Runavík players
Havnar Bóltfelag players
B68 Toftir players
Association football forwards
Association football midfielders